Greg David Rutherford (born 17 May 1994) is an English footballer who plays for Whitby Town.

Career
Rutherford was born in North Shields. He started his career in the youth team of Hartlepool United on a two-year scholarship in the summer of 2010. In April 2012, Rutherford was offered his first professional contract. On 14 April 2012, he made his professional debut in a 2–1 defeat to Chesterfield, coming on as a late substitute for Gary Liddle.

Rutherford then signed a short-term deal in the summer of 2012, which was later extended in early January 2013. He scored his first ever professional goal after only being on the pitch for 90 seconds in a 3–1 away win against Portsmouth on 26 January 2013. At the end of the 2013–14 season, Rutherford was one of four players released by Hartlepool.

Rutherford signed for Conference side Dover Athletic in October 2014.

On 2 February 2015, Rutherford signed for Scottish Championship club Alloa Athletic.
While playing for Berwick Rangers, Rutherford won the Scottish League Two player of the month award for March 2017.

Rutherford was signed by Blyth Spartans in October 2017 after being released by Berwick.

In 2018, Rutherford signed for Whitby Town and scored twice on his debut in a 2–0 win over Marske United.

Career statistics

References

External links

1994 births
Living people
English footballers
Association football midfielders
Hartlepool United F.C. players
English Football League players
Dover Athletic F.C. players
National League (English football) players
Alloa Athletic F.C. players
Scottish Professional Football League players
People from Whitley Bay
Footballers from Tyne and Wear
Arbroath F.C. players
Berwick Rangers F.C. players
Blyth Spartans A.F.C. players